Amino esters are a class of local anesthetics. They are named for their ester bond (and are unlike amide local anaesthetics).

Structure
Structurally, local anesthetics consist of three molecular components:

 a lipophilic part
 an intermediate aliphatic chain
 a hydrophilic (amine) part

The chemical linkage between the lipophilic part and the intermediate chain can be of the amide-type or the ester-type, and is the general basis for the current classification of local anesthetics.

Amino esters, in reference to anesthetic agents, are rapidly metabolized in the plasma by butyrylcholinesterase to para-aminobenzoic acid derivatives, then excreted in the urine. This suggests their very short half lives. Allergy is more likely to occur with ester-type agents, as opposed to amide-type.

Examples
Amino ester-type include:

 Cocaine
 Procaine (Novocain)
 Tetracaine (Pontocaine)
 Benzocaine
 Chloroprocaine

References
University of Texas Med School, Pharmacology Syllabus.
Katzung. 10th edition. Chapter 26.

Local anesthetics